Hélène Velasco-Graciet is a French professor of geography and was the president of the Bordeaux Montaigne University from 2016 to 2020.

Velascho-Graciet's work has touched on geography, borders, and culture.

In 2020, Velasco-Graciet was covered in the news as part of the Bordeaux Montaigne University's suspension of all travel to China during the COVID-19 pandemic.

References

Year of birth missing (living people)
Living people
French women academics
Academic staff of the University of Bordeaux